The Principality of Zeta is a historiographical name for a late medieval principality located in the southern parts of modern Montenegro and northern parts of modern Albania, around the Lake of Skadar. It was ruled by the families of Balšić, Lazarević, Branković and Crnojević in succession from the second half of the 14th century until Ottoman conquest at the very end of the 15th century. Previously, the same region of Zeta was a Serbian crown land, that had become self-governing after the fall of the Serbian Empire, when the Balšić family created a regional principality, sometime after 1360.

Zeta under the Balšići

 Balša I (1356–1362)
 Đurađ I (1362–1378)
 Balša II (1378–1385)
 Đurađ II (1385–1403)
 Balša III (1403–1421)

Zeta under the Serbian Despotate

 Despot Stefan Lazarević (1421–1427)
 Despot Đurađ Branković (1427–1451)

Zeta under the Crnojevići

 Stefan I Crnojević (1451–1465)
 Ivan Crnojević (1465–1490)
 Đurađ Crnojević (1490–1496)
 Stefan II Crnojević (1496–1499)

See also
 Zeta (crown land)
 First Scutari War
 Second Scutari War
 History of Montenegro
 Venetian Albania

References

Sources

 
 
 
 
 
 
 

 
Former countries in the Balkans
States and territories established in the 1360s
States and territories disestablished in the 1490s
1360s establishments in Europe
1490s disestablishments in Europe
Former principalities